Buffals River can refer to:

 Buffels River (Eastern Cape), river in the Eastern Cape province of South Africa
 Buffels River (KwaZulu-Natal), river in KwaZulu-Natal, South Africa
 Buffels River (Northern Cape), river in the Northern Cape province of South Africa, see List of rivers of South Africa
 Buffels River (Western Cape), river in the Western Cape province of South Africa, tributary of the Groot River